Rose's Pawn Shop is an Americana, rock, folk and bluegrass band from Los Angeles, California. Their debut album,  The Arsonist, was released in May 2006. The band tours several times each year throughout the United States.

On their later album Gravity Well, the fiercely independent young quintet known as Rose's Pawn Shop deliver a rousing, honest set that demonstrates exactly why this multi-talented, multi-instrumental L.A.-based fivesome has quickly risen from humble D.I.Y. origins to national notoriety, winning a fiercely loyal fan base in the process.

The 12 new tunes that comprise Gravity Well—produced by Ted Hutt, renowned for his work with the likes of the Dropkick Murphys, Gaslight Anthem and the Old Crow Medicine Show—make it clear why Rose's Pawn Shop has earned such a fervent following.  The band's catchy, anthemic songcraft channels the raw emotional power of America's folk, country and bluegrass traditions and puts them through a modern filter, creating timelessly resonant music.

Frontman Paul Givant's heartfelt, engaging songwriting surveys such time-honored subjects as heartache, loss, regret and redemption, echoing centuries of musical tradition while still sounding wholly contemporary.  Despite the lyrics' often-dark subject matter, the music is consistently uplifting, thanks to the musicians' infectious instrumental interplay and soaring three- and four-part harmonies.  The ensemble makes innovative use of banjo, fiddle, mandolin and upright bass, while maintaining an edgy swagger.

"I think that this music exists on two different levels," notes singer, guitarist and main songwriter Givant, adding, "The songs are passionate and emotional, and sometimes sad and heartbreaking.  But at the same time, the energy of the music makes you want to get up and dance and release all of that pent-up energy."

Rose's Pawn Shop's musical and emotional depth is apparent on such lyrically and melodically compelling new tunes as "What Were You Waiting For?," "Staring At the Door" and "On the Brink," which merge equal amounts of country twang and punk adrenaline.  Meanwhile, gentler numbers like "Go Get Gone," "Stay All Night" and the cinematic title track explore more introspective territory, and a memorable reading of the Dock Boggs standard "Country Blues" affirms the group's instinctive understanding of its vintage influences.

Growing up in the 1990s, Paul Givant absorbed a wide array of music, yet he was drawn most deeply to traditional folk and bluegrass, and inspired by the music's ability to illuminate the tragedies and triumphs of everyday life.  The influence of those genres loomed large when Givant began writing songs himself.

Through various mutual friendships, chance meetings and some help from Craigslist, Givant eventually connected with kindred musical spirits John Kraus, Tim Weed, Stephen Andrews and Christian Hogan, whose musical expertise, instrumental versatility and organic rapport were ideally suited to Givant's expansive musical vision.

"The original intent," Givant explains, "was to be kind of a bluegrass version of the Pogues, fusing bluegrass instrumentation and energy with rock and punk.  That's what our first album was like: gritty, high-energy and passionate, with a lot of instrumental virtuosity.  But over time, we've evolved to be more song-focused.  I think we've retained that original energy, but now we're more focused on crafting our arrangements so the song can shine though."

The nascent combo got its name after Rose, Givant's ex-girlfriend and former bandmate, stole the band's equipment from their rehearsal space and scattered their gear amongst various pawn shops throughout North Hollywood.  Fortunately, the musicians were able to recover their gear, and soon forged a formidable musical chemistry that manifested itself in their highly charged live shows, and on their 2010 release Dancing on the Gallows.

Rose's Pawn Shop's lineup solidified and began touring intensively in time to support Dancing on the Gallows, accumulating such landmarks as month-long residencies at New York's Parkside Lounge and L.A.'s Redwood Bar, busking in New Orleans' fabled Jackson Square, live radio sessions on such prestigious stations as KEXP in Seattle and WMBR in Boston, well-received appearances at various prestigious music festivals, and a slot opening for Jack White's Raconteurs, at White's invitation, at the Henry Fonda Theatre in Los Angeles.

Dancing on the Gallows spent several weeks on CMJ's influential album chart, while receiving extensive national and international airplay on college, AAA, country and alternative radio formats.  Meanwhile, the band's diligent roadwork—which has taken them across North America several times, along with visits to the U.K. and Ireland—has allowed Rose's Pawn Shop to continue winning fans and friends across the nation and around the world.

"Our travels have had a big influence on our evolution," Givant states.  "Meeting other bands and meeting people from all over the world at our shows has had a big influence on our songwriting, and opened us up to new musical traditions. Seeing the world in general and being away from home for long periods of time has influenced many of our songs.  It's matured us, as people and as a band."

Rose's Pawn Shop's ongoing musical journey yields considerable musical rewards on Gravity Well, making it clear that the band's creative horizons are unlimited.

"We've always been about the music and the songs, and the expression of the human experience through music," says Givant.  "But we've matured as musicians over time, and I think that that's been reflected in the music.  We've learned that we don't all have to play crazy at all times, and we've learned to pick our moments to shine and deliver the songs in the most clear, concise and passionate way possible."

Formation
Formed in August 2005, Rose's Pawn Shop is a five-piece band consisting of:
Paul Givant - lead vocals, guitar and banjo
Tim Weed - fiddle, mandolin and vocals
John Kraus - banjo, mandolin, electric guitar and vocals
Stephen Andrews - upright bass
Christian Hogan - drums

Former members:
Sebastian St. John - fiddle, mandolin, accordion, Bouzouki, Greek lyra and vocals
Bill Clark - banjo, pedal steel, guitar and vocals
Derek Asuan-O'Brien - upright and gut bucket basses 
Derek Swenson - drums and vocals 
Dave Weinstein - original drummer, left the band to pursue a modeling career
Ulf Geist - drums

They have also recorded and performed with: "Soda"- banjo, guitars and vocals, Jimmy Stelling of The Hackensaw Boys, Wayne Hancock, Junior Brown, Flogging Molly, Th' Legendary Shack Shakers, The Scotch Greens, Jack White and The Raconteurs, Grace Potter & The Nocturnals, Ghostland Observatory, Blues Traveler, DeVotchka, Old Crow Medicine Show, Levon Helm, Blue Rodeo, Conor Oberst and the Mystic River Band, Railroad Earth, The Sadies, and The Duhks, and many others.

Awards
In 2006, Rose's Pawn Shop was awarded the 2006 Best Band in the West title in the Billboard Magazine/Disc Makers Independent Music World Series. They were also selected as Amoeba Records homegrown artist of the month for June 2006.  Following these awards Rose's Pawn Shop embarked on a three-month cross-country tour.

Press highlights
Rolling Stone premiered “What Were You Waiting For” music video in September 2014.
American Songwriter premiered “What Were You Waiting For” in July 2014.

Discography

References

External links
Main website
Rose's Pawn Shop booking page on High Road Touring
Review of The Arsonist by Miles of Music
About.com review of "The Arsonist"
KEXP review of "Dancing On the Gallows"
AOL's The Boot review of "Live Show in Nashville"

American bluegrass music groups
Rockabilly music groups
Country music groups from California
Rock music groups from California
Musical groups from Los Angeles